The drab water tyrant (Ochthornis littoralis) is a species of bird in the family Tyrannidae, the tyrant flycatchers, and is the only species in the monotypic genus Ochthornis. It is found in Bolivia, Brazil, Colombia, Ecuador, French Guiana, Guyana, Peru, and Venezuela, where its natural habitat is rivers.

Physical Description 
The drab water tyrant has a short whitish supercilium, and darker dust-brown wings and tail. Its size is about 13 to 13.5 centimeters, and it weighs about 13.4 grams. It is named for both its plumage and strict association with waterside habitats. The beak is short and narrow, contradicting its plump round body.

Habitat 
Drab water tyrants are found along tropical rivers, near steep banks and piles of debris, and by exposed roots, as they flourish near water. The drab water tyrant has also been spotted along other bodies of water, including wetlands, streams, creeks, and waterfalls.

Location 
The drab water tyrant is found in the continent of South America, in the neotropical biogeographical realm. Drab water tyrants are not migrant birds, so they remain in their South American habitats. They are most commonly found across the greater part of Amazonia, except the eastern quarter, and are also present in the coastal French Guiana region and extreme northeast Brazil.

Taxonomy 
Drab water tyrants are monotypic birds from the Ochthornis littoralis subspecies. They are the sole members of Ochthornis, although this genus has sometimes been merged with the Andean chat tyrants Ochthoeca.

Diet 
The diet of the drab water tyrant consists of small insects that can be found along the tropical riverbanks. There is not much information on exactly what insects the drab water tyrant consumes, however, insects that are commonly found in the Amazonian regions are: rhino beetles, leaf-cutter ants, paper wasps, dung beetles, brown stick insects, and many others. These small birds choose to perch upon branches that are roughly 2 meters away from the water's edge to make for an easy attack on their prey. The drab water tyrant usually only flies short distances for its meals.

Behavior and Breeding 
Drab water tyrants are typically quiet and are frequently found in pairs. In Peru, the drab water tyrant breeds in the months between April and October. When they breed, they nest in an open cup of grass stems, rootlets, and mud, placed about 3 meters above the river edge or in the steep riverbank, often under a log or overhang or on a hard mud ledge. They will typically lay three to four eggs.

Conservation Status 
The drab water tyrant is not a globally threatened bird as their global threatened classification is considered to be the least concerned. They are fairly common in their habitats of South America, but they are spread sparsely along rivers.

Population Trend 
As the drab water tyrant is not globally threatened, their population trend is stable. There are no extreme fluctuations seen in the population trends of the drab water tyrant, and they remain to be fairly common.

Sounds and Vocal Behavior 
The drab water tyrant has a generally quiet and weak call. They pair with another bird, making a whistled “fweet” sound,” following along with a rapid, excited, and sputtered warbling “weechidle-chee” sound. These sounds are repeated 4-6 times and often accompanied by wing fluttering.

References

External links
Drab water tyrant photo gallery VIREO
Photo-High Res-(perched on branch); Article pbase.com–"Ecuador Birds"

drab water tyrant
Birds of the Amazon Basin
Birds of the Guianas
drab water tyrant
Taxonomy articles created by Polbot